The blue jewel-babbler (Ptilorrhoa caerulescens) is a species of bird in the family Cinclosomatidae.
It is found in New Guinea.
Its natural habitat is subtropical or tropical moist lowland forests.

References

blue jewel-babbler
Birds of New Guinea
blue jewel-babbler
Taxonomy articles created by Polbot